Melinda Hammond (b. in Bristol, England) is an awarded British writer of romance novels since 1980, she also uses the pseudonym of Sarah Mallory.

Biography
Melinda Hammond was born in Bristol, England, UK, and grew up on Barton Hill with three older brothers. At 16, she left school to work.

She started to writing when was at home with her first child. In 1980, she sold her first novel at Robert Hale. As Sarah Mallory, she wrote at Mills & Boon.

Awards
 Dance for a Diamond: 2005 – The Reviewers Choice award from Singletitles.com
 Gentlemen in Question: 2006 – Historical Novel Society's Editors Choice.
 The Earl's Runaway Bride: 2010 – CataNetwork Reviewers Choice Award.
 The Dangerous Lord Darrington: 2012 – Love Story of the Year by the Romantic Novelists' Association.

Bibliography

As Melinda Hammond

Single novels
 Fortune's Lady (1982)
 Summer Charade (1982)
 Maid of Honour (2002)
 The Bargain (2002)
 Lady Vengeance (2003)
 The Highclough Lady (2004)
 A Lady at Midnight (2005)
 Dance for a Diamond (2005)
 Gentlemen in Question (2006)
 The Belle Dames Club (2007)
 A Rational Romance (2007)
 Lucasta (2008)

Lagallan Brothers Series
 Autumn Bride (1983)
 The Dream Chasers (2003)

As Sarah Mallory

Single novels
 More Than a Governess (2008)
 The Wicked Baron (2009)
 Wicked Captain, Wayward Wife (2010)
 The Earl's Runaway Bride (2010)
 Disgrace and Desire (2010)
 To Catch a Husband... (2011)
 The Dangerous Lord Darrington (2011)

The Notorious Coale Brothers Series
 Beneath the Major's Scars (2012)
 Behind the Rake's Wicked Wager (2013)

Castonbury Park Multiauthor Series
5. The Illegitimate Montague (2012)

Omnibus
 More Than a Governess / Wicked Captain, Wayward Wife / The Earl's Runaway Bride (2010)

Anthologies in collaboration
 On Mothering Sunday (More Than a Governess / The Angel and the Outlaw) (2009) (with Kathryn Albright)
 One Snowy Regency Christmas (A Regency Christmas Carol / Snowbound With the Notorious Rake) (2011) (with Christine Merrill)
 Some Like It Wicked / Warriors in Winter / Beneath the Major's Scars (2012) (with Carole Mortimer and Michelle Willingham)

References

Year of birth missing (living people)
Writers from Bristol
English romantic fiction writers
RoNA Award winners
Living people
Pseudonymous women writers
20th-century English novelists
21st-century English novelists
20th-century British women writers
21st-century British women writers
20th-century pseudonymous writers
21st-century pseudonymous writers